Jesse Phillips may refer to:

Jesse Phillips (canoeist) (born 1986), Australian canoeist
Jesse J. Phillips (1837–1901), American jurist
Jesse S. Phillips (1871–1954), American politician